The Pointe des Aigrettes is a headland on the island of Réunion in the Indian Ocean.  Located in the commune of Saint-Paul, along the island's western coast, it marks the westernmost point of the territory, and may be found close to the entrance to Saint-Gilles-les-Bains along Route nationale 1.

Headlands of Réunion